Aleviler is an idiom, being used synonymously in Turkish language with Shi'ites, to characterize the Zaydids of Tabaristan, Daylam and Gilan; the Bātinī-Ismāʿīlīs of Pamir Mountains in Turkestan and the Non-Ja'fari Twelver-Shi'ites in Turkey.

Classification of Aleviler
 Turkestan Alevis
 Zaid'īyyah Alavids of the Tabaristan, Daylam and Gilan, emerged under the influence of the Hasan ibn Zayd and the efforts of Hasan ibn Ali al-Utrush
 Bātinī-Ismāʿīl'īyyah Alevis of the Pamir Mountains, emerged under the influence of the Ismailyya Da'i Nasir Khusraw al-Qubadiani of the Fatimid caliph Abū Tamīm Ma'add al-Mustanṣir bi-llāh
 Bābā'ī-Bātin'īyyah (Mostly Turkish and some Kurdish) Alevis
 Sāfav'īyyah-Kızılbaşism/Qizilbash Tariqa, a religious ghulāt-Alevi community in Turkey, emerged under the influence of Kaysanites Shia, Khurramiyyah Tariqa, and Shah Ismail of the Safavid dynasty in Iran
 Ḥurūfī'īyyah-Bektashism/Bektashiyyah Tariqa, a religious Alevi-Bātinī community in Turkey, Balkans and Albania, emerged under the influence of Ismailiyyah Shia, Shamanism and Tengrism
 Arab Alawis or Nosairis, a branch of ghulāt bātin'īyyah-Twelvers, now present in Syria, Southern Turkey and Northern Lebanon, founded by Ibn Nusayr and Al-Khaṣībī
Anthropopathic Ali-Illahism
Anti-Islamic Chinarism or Ishik Alevism, also known as Alevism without Ali
Non-Islamic Kurdish Esoterism or Yârsânism, also known as Ahl-E Haqq or Kaka'is
 

{| class="navbox" style="float:center; margin: 2ex 0 0.6em 0.5em; width: 8em; line-height:111%;"
!The schematic history of the development of the Imāmī-Bektāşīlik from other Shī'ah Muslim sects 
|-   Shī'ah Imāmī Alevī Bektāshī Ṭarīqah
|

References

Further reading

Alavids

Bektashism
 Brown, John (1927), The Darvishes of Oriental Spiritualism.
 Küçük, Hülya (2002) The Roles of the Bektashis in Turkey's National Struggle. Leiden: Brill.
 Mélikoff, Irène (1998). Hadji Bektach: Un mythe et ses avatars. Genèse et évolution du soufisme populaire en Turquie. Leiden: Islamic History and Civilization, Studies and Texts, volume 20, .
 Vorhoff, Karin. (1998), "Academic and Journalistic Publications on the Alevi and Bektashi of Turkey." In: Tord Olsson/Elizabeth Özdalga/Catharina Raudvere (eds.) Alevi Identity: Cultural, Religious and Social Perspectives, Istanbul: Swedish Research Institute, pp. 23–50.
 Yaman, Ali & Aykan Erdemir (2006). Alevism-Bektashism: A Brief Introduction, London: England Alevi Cultural Centre & Cem Evi.

Kızılbaşism
 Halm, H. (1982). Die Islamische Gnosis: Die extreme Schia und die Alawiten. Zurich.
 Kehl-Bodrogi, Krisztina (1992). Die Kizilbas/Aleviten. Untersuchungen uber eine esoterische Glaubensgemeinschaft in Anatolien. Die Welt des Islams, (New Series), Vol. 32, No. 1.
 Krisztina Kehl-Bodrogi, Krisztina, & Barbara Kellner-Heinkele, Anke Otter-Beaujean, eds. (1997) Syncretistic Religious Communities in the Near East. Leiden: Brill, pp. 11–18.
 Moosa, Matti (1988). Extremist Shiites: The Ghulat Sects, Syracuse University Press.

Ahl-e Haqq Tariqa and Kurdish Alevis
 Elahi, Bahram (1987). The path of perfection, the spiritual teachings of Master Nur Ali Elahi. .
 Encyclopedia of the Modern Middle East and North Africa (Detroit: Thompson Gale, 2004) p. 82.
 Edmonds, Cecil (1957). Kurds, Turks, and Arabs: politics, travel, and research in north-eastern Iraq, 1919–1925. Oxford University Press.
 
 Kreyenbroek, P. G. (1992). Review of The Yaresan: A Sociological, Historical and Religio-Historical Study of a Kurdish Community, by M. Reza Hamzeh'ee, 1990, . Bulletin of the School of Oriental and African Studies, University of London, Vol.55, No.3, pp. 565–566.
 White, Paul J. (2003), "The Debate on the Identity of "Alevi Kurds"." In: Paul J. White/Joost Jongerden (eds.) Turkey's Alevi Enigma: A Comprehensive Overview. Leiden: Brill, pp. 17–32.

Alevis